Wesele may refer to:
 A title translated from Polish language as "Wedding reception" 
The Wedding (1901 play)
The Wedding (1972 film)
The Wedding (2004 film)
Jone Wesele, international rugby league footballer
Wesele Cove, a cove on the south coast of King George Island, South Shetland Islands